Leonard Huxley (11 December 1860 – 2 May 1933) was an English schoolteacher, writer and editor.

Biography

Family 

Huxley's father was the zoologist Thomas Henry Huxley, commonly referred to as 'Darwin's bulldog'. He was educated at University College School, London, the University of St Andrews, and Balliol College, Oxford. He first married Julia Arnold who founded a school. She was the daughter of the academic Tom Arnold. She was a sister of the novelist Mrs Humphry Ward, niece of the poet Matthew Arnold, and granddaughter of Thomas Arnold, the headmaster of Rugby School (immortalised as a character in Tom Brown's Schooldays).

Their four children included the biologist Julian Huxley (1887–1975) and the writer Aldous Huxley (1894–1963). Their middle son, Noel Trevenen (born in 1889), committed suicide in 1914. Their daughter, Margaret Arnold Huxley, was born in 1899. Julia Arnold died of cancer in 1908. 

After the death of his first wife, Leonard married Rosalind Bruce, and had two further sons. The elder of these was David Bruce Huxley (1915–1992), whose daughter Angela married George Pember Darwin, son of the physicist Charles Galton Darwin. The younger was the 1963 Nobel Prize-winning physiologist Andrew Huxley (1917–2012).

Work 
Huxley's major biographies were the three volumes of Life and Letters of Thomas Henry Huxley and the two volumes of Life and Letters of Sir Joseph Dalton Hooker OM GCSI. He also published Thomas Henry Huxley: a character sketch, and a short biography of Darwin. He was assistant master at Charterhouse School between 1884 and 1901. He was then the assistant editor of Cornhill Magazine between 1901 and 1916, becoming its editor in 1916.

 1900 Life and Letters of Thomas Henry Huxley. 2 vols.
 1912 Thoughts on education drawn from the writings of Matthew Arnold (editor).
 1913 Scott's last expedition (editor). 2 vols.
 1918 Life and Letters of Sir Joseph Dalton Hooker OM, GCSI. 2 vols.
 1920 Anniversaries, and other poems.
 1920 Thomas Henry Huxley: a character sketch.
 1920 Charles Darwin.
 1924 Jane Welsh Carlyle: letters to her family 1839–1863 (editor).
 1926 Progress and the unfit.
 1926 Sheaves from the Cornhill. 
 1930 Elizabeth Barrett Browning: letters to her sister 1846–1859 (editor).

External links 

 
 
 

1860 births
1933 deaths
Leonard
Alumni of the University of St Andrews
People educated at University College School
English writers